The June 14-15, 1963 race at Lime Rock Park was the fifth racing event of the thirteenth season of the Sports Car Club of America's National Sports Car Championship. Held under the auspices of the SCCA's New England Region, the event started on Friday with two races, and after an overnight rain which left the unpaved paddock looking like a lake, the racing concluded on Saturday, as there was  an injunction forbidding Sunday racing at the venue which continues to the present day. In addition to the classes listed below, individual races were also held for a Formula cars, won by Arch McNeill in his Lotus 18 Formula Jr #18 (on Friday afternoon), and a race for the Modified cars on Saturday, won by Peter Sachs in his FM Lotus 23 #37, with second place and first in CM (upclassed, as there were no other DM or EM cars) taken by Joe Buzzetta's #7 "Bosch Special" Porsche. M.R.J. "Doc" Wyllie took GM in his ubiquitous #7 Lola, Chuck Dietrich 2nd in GM with the #88 Bobsy, with GM honorable mention in 3rd going to local resident and motorsports legend John Fitch in a BMC #45.

Production Class Results

References

   2. August, 1963 "Sports Car" magazine, Sports car Club of America, Westport, CT

External links
RacingSportsCars.com
World Sports Racing Prototypes
Lime Rock